The 1995 Princeton Tigers football team was an American football team that represented Princeton University during the 1995 NCAA Division I-AA football season. Princeton won the Ivy League championship.

In their ninth year under head coach Steve Tosches, the Tigers compiled an 8–1–1 record and outscored opponents 243 to 144. Dave Patterson was the team captain.

Princeton's 5–1–1 conference record topped the Ivy League standings. The Tigers outscored Ivy opponents 148 to 98. 

Princeton played its home games at Palmer Stadium on the university campus in Princeton, New Jersey.

Schedule

References

Princeton
Princeton Tigers football seasons
Ivy League football champion seasons
Princeton Tigers football